Tharrhalea evanida, synonym Diaea evanida, also called the pink flower spider, is a species of spider in the family Thomisidae. It is found in Australia (the Northern Territory, Queensland and New South Wales) and in New Guinea.

References

External links
Pink Flower Spider on BrisbaneInsects.com

Thomisidae
Spiders of Australia
Spiders described in 1867